The following is a list of academics, both past and present, recognized for their contributions to the field of cognitive psychology.

 Lise Abrams
 Tracy Packiam Alloway
 John R. Anderson
 Magda Arnold
 Janette Atkinson
 David Ausubel
 Alan Baddeley
 Albert Bandura
 Frederic Bartlett
 Elizabeth Bates
 Aaron T. Beck
 Iris Berent
 Lera Boroditsky
 Gordon H. Bower
 Donald Broadbent
 Jerome Bruner
 Susan Carey
 Patricia Cheng
 Noam Chomsky
 Michael Cole
 Lorenza Colzato
 Fergus Craik
 Kenneth Craik
 Pamela Dalton
 Antonio Damasio
 Hermann Ebbinghaus
 Albert Ellis
 William Estes
 Eugene Galanter
 Vittorio Gallese
 C. Randy Gallistel
 Michael Gazzaniga
 Rochel Gelman
 Dedre Gentner
 Vittorio Guidano
 Keith Holyoak
 Philip Johnson-Laird
 Daniel Kahneman
 Nancy Kanwisher
 Jung-Mo Lee
 Eric Lenneberg
 Alan Leslie
 Willem Levelt
 Elizabeth Loftus
 Alexander Luria
 Brian MacWhinney
 George Mandler
 Jean Matter Mandler
 James McClelland
 George Armitage Miller
 Naomi Miyake
 Ken Nakayama
 Ulric Neisser
 Allen Newell
 Allan Paivio
 Seymour Papert
 Jean Piaget
 Steven Pinker
 Michael Posner
 Karl H. Pribram
 Zenon Pylyshyn
 Giacomo Rizzolatti
 Henry L. Roediger III
 Eleanor Rosch
 David Rumelhart
 Eleanor Saffran
 Daniel Schacter
 Otto Selz
 Roger Shepard
 Richard Shiffrin
 Herbert A. Simon
 Linda B. Smith
 Elizabeth Spelke
 George Sperling
 Robert Sternberg
 Larry Squire
 Saul Sternberg
 Esther Thelen
 Anne Treisman
 Endel Tulving
 Amos Tversky
 Lev Vygotsky

List of cognitive psychologists
Cognitive psychologists
Cognitive psychologists